Dolores Pampin (born 20 December 1973) is an Argentine former fencer. She won a bronze medal in the team foil event at the 1995 Pan American Games. She also competed in the women's individual and team foil events at the 1996 Summer Olympics.

References

External links
 

1973 births
Living people
Argentine female foil fencers
Olympic fencers of Argentina
Fencers at the 1996 Summer Olympics
Pan American Games medalists in fencing
Pan American Games bronze medalists for Argentina
Fencers at the 1995 Pan American Games
Medalists at the 1995 Pan American Games
20th-century Argentine women